The Blue Dragon Film Award for Best Cinematography and Lighting is one of the awards that is presented annually at the Blue Dragon Film Awards by Sports Chosun, which is typically held at the end of the year.

Winners

1963–2013: Best Cinematography

2005–2013: Best Lighting

2014–present: Best Cinematography and Lighting

References

General references

External links 
  
 

Blue Dragon Film Awards